Rhys or Rhŷs is a popular Welsh given name (usually male) that is famous in Welsh history and is also used as a surname. It originates from Deheubarth, an old region of South West Wales, with famous kings such as Rhys ap Tewdwr.

Anglicised forms of the name include Reece, Rees, Reese and Rice.

People with the given name

History 

 Rhys ap Gruffydd (1132–1197), 12th-century ruler of southern Wales
 Sir Rhys ap Gruffydd (died 1356), 14th-century Welsh nobleman
 Rhys ap Gruffydd (rebel) (1508–1531), executed 16th-century Welsh landowner
 Rhys ap Tewdwr (died 1093), 11th-century prince of southern Wales
 Rhys ap Thomas (1449–1525), a Welsh soldier and landholder who was instrumental in the victory of Henry Tudor at the Battle of Bosworth Field
 Rhys Lewis (born 1532), MP  for New Radnor Boroughs October 1553 and 1558
 Rhys Hooe (c. 1599 – after 1655), Virginia colonist from Wales

Modern times

 Rhys Bobridge (born 1981), Australian singer and dancer
 Rhys Chatham (born 1952), American avant-garde "guitar orchestra" composer
 Rhys (singer) (Rhys Clarstedt, born 1997), Swedish-American singer
 Rhys Coiro (born 1979), American film actor and singer
 Rhys Darby (born 1974), stand-up comedian from New Zealand
 Rhys Davies (born 1985), Welsh golfer
 Rhys Day (born 1982), Welsh footballer
 Rhys Evans (born 1982), English footballer
 Rhys Frake-Waterfield, English filmmaker
 Rhys Fulber (born 1970), Canadian musician (Front Line Assembly)
 Rhys Gemmell (born 1896), former tennis player from Australia
 Rhys Hanbury (born 1985), Australian rugby league footballer
 Rhys Hoskins (born 1993), American professional baseball player
 Rhys Huber (born 1986), Canadian voice actor
 Rhys Hughes (born 1966), Welsh writer
 Rhys Ifans (born 1967), Welsh actor
 Rhys Isaac, professor
 Rhys James, English comedian
 Rhys Jones (disambiguation), the name of several people
 Rhys Jenkins (born 1990), rugby union player
 Rhys Millen, car racer
 Rhys Muldoon (born 1965), Australian actor
 Rhys Oakley (born 1980), Wales international rugby union player
 Rhys Palmer (born 1989), Australian rules footballer
 Rhys Patchell Welsh rugby union player
 Rhys Priestland (born 1987), Welsh rugby union player
 Rhys Rhys-Williams (1865–1955), British Liberal Party politician
 Rhys Stanley (born 1990), Australian rules footballer
 Rhys Taylor (born 1990), Welsh footballer
 Rhys Thomas (comedian) (born 1978), English comedian and actor
 Rhys M. Thomas (born 1982), Welsh international rugby union player
 Rhys Wakefield (born 1988), Australian actor
 Rhys Webb (born 1988), Welsh rugby union player
 Rhys Wesser (born 1979), Australian professional rugby league footballer
 Rhys Williams (rugby union, born 1980), Welsh rugby player
 R. H. Williams (rugby union) (1930–1993), Welsh rugby player

People with the middle name or compound last name
 Samaire Rhys Armstrong, (born 1980), American actress
 Griff Rhys Jones (born 1953), Welsh comedian and presenter
 T. Rhys Thomas, Wales international rugby union player
 John Rhys-Davies (born 1944), Welsh actor
 Tim Rhys-Evans (born 1972), Welsh musician
 Brandon Rhys-Williams (1927–1988), British Conservative Party politician
 Rhys Rhys-Williams (1865–1955), British Liberal Party politician
 Jonathan Rhys Meyers (born 1977), Irish actor
 John Rhys Plumlee (born 2001), American football quarterback for the University of Central Florida Knights
 Sophie, Duchess of Edinburgh, (born Sophie Rhys-Jones; 1965) member of the British royal family

People with the surname

 Beti Rhys, (1907–2003), Welsh bookstore owner and author
 Elen Rhys, (born 1983), Welsh actress
 Ernest Rhys (1859–1946), English writer
 Gruff Rhys (born 1970), vocalist and guitarist
 Jean Rhys (1890–1979), Caribbean writer
 Sir John Rhŷs (1840–1915), Celtic scholar at Oxford
 John Llewellyn Rhys, an airman memorialised by John Llewellyn Rhys prize
 Keidrych Rhys (1915–1987), Welsh literary journalist and editor
 Matthew Rhys (born 1974), Welsh actor
 Morgan John Rhys (1760–1804), Baptist minister
 Paul Rhys (born 1963), Welsh television, film and theatre actor
 Phillip Rhys (born 1974), English actor
 Siôn Dafydd Rhys (1534 – c. 1609), Welsh physician and grammarian

Fictional characters

 Lt Cmdr Gen Rhys, from Star Trek Discovery, portrayed by Patrick Kwok-Choon.
Rhys (Rhysand), from the series A Court of Thorns and Roses by Sarah J. Maas
 Knight Rhys, a member of the Brotherhood of steel in Fallout 4
 Rhys Winterborne from Marrying Winterborne, by Lisa Kleypas 
 Rhys, in the Fire Emblem: Path of Radiance video game
 Rhys, in the Merry Gentry book series by Laurell K. Hamilton
 Rhys, the central character of the first generation of Phantasy Star III
 Rhys Strongfork, a main player-character from the Tales from the Borderlands video game, CEO of the Atlas corporation in Borderlands 3 video game
 Rhys, in The Two Princesses of Bamarre by Gail Carson Levine
 Rhys Ashworth, on the British soap Hollyoaks
 Rhys Dahl, in Switched by Amanda Hlcking
 Rhys Dallows, from the video game Star Wars: Starfighter
 Rhys Lawson, from the Australian soap opera Neighbours
 Rhys Lewis, the eponymous subject of the 1885 novel by Daniel Owen
 Rhys Maelwaedd, a character of the Deverry Cycle book series
 Rhys Rhysson, the Low King of the dwarfs in Terry Pratchett's Discworld books
 Rhys Williams, in the BBC science fiction series Torchwood
 Rhys, an elvish hunter in the Gilt-Leaf tribe, from the Lorwyn and Shadowmoor blocks of the collectible card game, Magic: The Gathering
 Rhys Sutherland, in the Home and Away television series

The patronymic form

The surnames Price, Prys, Pris and Preece are derived from the Welsh ap Rhys meaning 'son of Rhys'. Notable people with this surname include:
 John Prise or Price (1501–1555), also called Syr Siôn ap Rhys, Welsh scholar and author of the first book to be printed in Welsh,
 Hywel ap Rhys (c. 840 – 886), ancient Welsh king of Glywysing
 Tomos Prys (c. 1564 – 1634), Welsh soldier, sailor and poet

References

See also

 Rhyce Shaw (born 1981) Australian rules football player
 Ryce (surname)
 Reece (disambiguation)
 Reese (disambiguation)
 Rees (disambiguation)
 Rhees (disambiguation)
 Reis (disambiguation)
 Rhyse (disambiguation)
 Rice (disambiguation)
 Rise (disambiguation)
 Ryse (disambiguation)
 Rys (disambiguation)

Surnames of Welsh origin
Welsh masculine given names